Bald Creek Historic District is a national historic district within the community of Bald Creek located about ten miles west of Burnsville, Yancey County, North Carolina.

The district encompasses 18 contributing buildings and 5 contributing structures in the Bald Creek community. The district includes notable examples of Bungalow / American Craftsman and Rustic Revival style architecture.  Notable contributing resources include the C.W. Burton House (c. 1900), Burton-Howell House (c. 1930), Works Progress Administration supported Bald Creek Elementary School and Gymnasium (1938), Bald Creek United Methodist Church (1951-1955), Wilson House (c. 1930), and Glenn Proffitt House (c. 1920).

It was listed on the National Register of Historic Places in 2009.

References 

Works Progress Administration in North Carolina
Historic districts on the National Register of Historic Places in North Carolina
Buildings and structures in Yancey County, North Carolina
National Register of Historic Places in Yancey County, North Carolina